Edward Paul Flanders (December 29, 1934 – February 22, 1995)  was an American actor. He is best known for playing Dr. Donald Westphall in the medical drama series St. Elsewhere (1982–1988). Flanders was nominated for eight Primetime Emmys and won three times in 1976, 1977, and 1983.

He received a Tony Award and a Drama Desk Award for his performance in the 1973 production of A Moon for the Misbegotten.

Early life 
Flanders was born in Minneapolis, Minnesota, the son of Bernice (née Brown) and Francis Michael Grey Flanders. His mother was killed in an automobile accident when he was 14. After graduating from Patrick Henry High School (where he played hockey) in 1952, he enlisted in the United States Army, where he served as an X-ray technician.

Early career 
After his service with the United States Army ended, Flanders began his acting career on Broadway before moving on to guest parts in television series. From 1967 through 1975, Flanders appeared in more than a dozen American TV shows, including six appearances on Hawaii Five-O (as five different characters). During this time, he was also prolific in TV movies. He married actress Ellen Geer, with whom he had a son, Ian Flanders (born 1966) before they divorced.

In the late 1970s, Flanders moved away from small TV roles to take major credits in both TV and feature films, while continuing his stage career. In 1974, Flanders won a Tony Award for Best Supporting or Featured Actor in a Dramatic Presentation for A Moon for the Misbegotten by Eugene O'Neill on Broadway. He also won an Emmy award in 1976 for the TV movie adaptation of A Moon for the Misbegotten.

St. Elsewhere 
In 1982, he began his role in St. Elsewhere that earned him five Emmy Award nominations as Outstanding Lead Actor in a TV Series, winning the award in 1983. After a stormy departure from the series in 1987, he returned for two more episodes in 1988, including the series finale. During a scene in which Westphall addressed the staff, Flanders began speaking extemporaneously about the quality of art and had to be edited for broadcast. Although he later returned for guest appearances, his exit on St. Elsewhere as a regular cast member was titled Moon for the Misbegotten after the play that won him a Tony Award. The episode gained much publicity as Westphall left the hospital after "mooning" his new boss, Dr. John Gideon (played by Ronny Cox). Flanders continued his working relationship with executive producer Bruce Paltrow in the short-lived 1994 CBS series The Road Home.

Notable roles 
In addition to his six-year role as Dr. Donald Westphall, Flanders is noted as the actor who has played President Harry Truman more times, and in more separate productions, than any other. He portrayed Truman at the end of World War II and during the Korean War in Truman at Potsdam, Harry S. Truman: Plain Speaking, and MacArthur. In MacArthur, Flanders had second billing to Gregory Peck's lead as General Douglas MacArthur. 

In feature films, Flanders performed major roles in two dark movies based on novels by William Peter Blatty. In the first, The Ninth Configuration (1980), he plays Col. Richard Fell, a self-effacing medic at a secret U.S. Army psychiatric facility who assists Marine psychiatrist Col. Vincent Kane (Stacy Keach). The film was based on Blatty's 1978 novel of the same name, itself a reworking of his earlier, darkly satirical novel Twinkle, Twinkle, "Killer" Kane (1966). In 1990, Flanders played Father Dyer alongside star George C. Scott in Blatty's The Exorcist III based on the novel Legion.

One of Flanders's best-remembered TV guest roles was in the first season M*A*S*H episode "Yankee Doodle Doctor", playing film director Lt. Duane William Bricker, who is making a documentary about M*A*S*H units and visits the 4077th.  After Hawkeye and Trapper sabotage his effort, Bricker abandons the project and leaves. 

Flanders also played nationally known journalist William Allen White in the 1977 made-for-TV movie Mary White. This movie was based on the famous eulogy White wrote about his daughter after her death in 1922 due to a blow to the head while riding her horse. He also appeared in the 1979 made-for-TV-horror-miniseries Salem's Lot as Dr. Bill Norton. He also played news anchor John Woodley in the 1983 made-for-TV suspense drama Special Bulletin, about a group of environmentalists who threaten to detonate a nuclear weapon in Charleston, South Carolina.

Later life and death 
After three divorces, chronic pain from a back injury sustained in an automobile accident in 1989, and a lifelong battle with depression, Flanders died from a self-inflicted gunshot wound on February 22, 1995, in Denny, California at the age of 60. No suicide note was found, and his remains were cremated.

Filmography

Television
1967: Cimarron Strip (episode: "The Roarer") as Arliss Blynn
1969: Daniel Boone (episode: "The Traitor") as Lackland
1971: The Name of the Game (episode: "Beware of the Watchdog") as Lazlo Subich
1971: Travis Logan D.A. as Psychiatrist
1971: Bearcats! (episode: "The Hostage") as Ben Tillman
1971: Goodbye, Raggedy Ann (TV movie) as David Bevin
1971: McMillan & Wife (episode: "Husbands, Wives and Killers") as Tom Benton
1971: Mission Impossible (episode: "Blues") as Joe Belker
1972: Mannix (episode: "A Walk in the Shadows") as Tom Farnom
1972: Nichols a.k.a. James Garner as Nichols (episode: "Fight of the Century")
1972: Cade's County (episode: "The Fake") as Ben Crawford
1972: Ironside (episode: "Five days in the Death of Sgt. Brown: Part 1") as Phil McIver
1972: The Bold Ones: The New Doctors a.k.a. The New Doctors (episode: "Five Days in the Death of Sgt Brown: Part II") as Phil McIver
1972: M*A*S*H (episode: "Yankee Doodle Doctor") as Lt Dwayne Bricker
1972: Banyon (episode: "Just Once") as Sergeant Randall
1973: Kung Fu (episode: "The Salamander") as Alonzo Davis
1973: Marcus Welby, M.D. a.k.a. Robert Young, Family Doctor (episode: "The Comeback") as Magruder
1974: Barnaby Jones (episode: "Death on Deposit") as "Doc" Fred Tucker
1969–1975: Hawaii Five-O (6 episodes):
1969 "Up Tight" as David Stone
1970 "Three Dead Cows at Makapuu" (2-part episode) as Dr Alexander Kline
1970 "The Guarnerius Caper" as Dmitri Rostov
1972 "While You're at It, Bring in the Moon" as Byers
1974 "One Born Every Minute" as Joe Connors
1975 "And the Horse Jumped Over the Moon" as Bernie Ross
1975: The Mary Tyler Moore Show (episode: "Mary's Father") as Father Terrance Brian
1975: The Legend of Lizzie Borden as Hosea Knowlton
1975: Attack on Terror: The FBI vs. the Ku Klux Klan as Justice Department attorney Ralph Paine
1976: Hallmark Hall of Fame (episode: "Truman at Potsdam") as President Harry S Truman
1979: Backstairs at the White House (episodes 1.1, 1.2 and 1.4) as President Calvin Coolidge
1979: Blind Ambition (TV mini-series) as Charles Shaffer
1979: Salem's Lot a.k.a. Blood Thirst as Dr Bill Norton
1982–1988: St. Elsewhere - 120 episodes as Dr. Donald Westphall
1993: Jack's Place (episode: "Who Knew?") as Marcus Toback
1994: The Road Home (pilot episode) as William Babineaux

Films
1970: The Grasshopper or Passions or The Passing of Evil as Jack Benton
1972: The Trial of the Catonsville Nine as Father Daniel Berrigan
1972: The Snoop Sisters or The Female Instinct (TV Movie) as Milo Perkins
1973: Hunter (TV Movie) as Dr Miles
1974: Indict and Convict (TV Movie) as Timothy Fitzgerald
1974: Things in Their Season (TV Movie) as Carl Gerlach
1975: The Legend of Lizzie Borden (TV Movie) as Hosea Knowlton
1975: Attack on Terror: The FBI vs. the Ku Klux Klan (TV Movie) as Ralph Paine
1975: A Moon for the Misbegotten (TV Movie) as Phil Hogan
1976: Eleanor and Franklin (TV Movie) as Louis Howe
1976: The Sad and Lonely Sundays (TV Movie) as Dr Frankman
1976: Harry S. Truman: Plain Speaking (TV Movie) as President Harry S. Truman
1977: The Amazing Howard Hughes (TV Movie) as Noah Dietrich
1977: MacArthur as President Harry S. Truman
1977: Mary White (TV Movie) as William Allen White
1979: Salem's Lot as Dr. Bill Norton
1980: The Ninth Configuration or Twinkle, Twinkle, Killer Kane as Col. Richard Fell
1981: Inchon as President Harry S. Truman (voice, uncredited)
1981: True Confessions as Dan T. Campion
1981: The Pursuit of D.B. Cooper or Pursuit as Brigadier
1981: Skokie or Once They Marched Through a Thousand Towns (UK title) (TV Movie) as Mayor Albert J. Smith
1982: Tomorrow's Child (TV Movie) as Anders Stenslund
1983: Special Bulletin (TV Movie) as John Woodley
1989: The Final Days (TV Movie) as Leonard Garment
1990: The Exorcist III as Father Joseph Dyer
1991: The Perfect Tribute (TV Movie) as Warren
1992: Citizen Cohn (TV Movie) as Joseph N. Welch
1993: Message from Nam as Ed Wilson
1995: Bye Bye Love as Walter Sims (final film role)

Awards and honors

Emmy nominations 
 1979 – Outstanding Supporting Actor in a Limited Series or a Special, for: Backstairs at the White House
 1984 – Outstanding Lead Actor in a Drama Series, for: St. Elsewhere
 1985 – Outstanding Lead Actor in a Drama Series, for: St. Elsewhere
 1986 – Outstanding Lead Actor in a Drama Series, for: St. Elsewhere
 1987 – Outstanding Lead Actor in a Drama Series, for: St. Elsewhere

Emmy Awards (won) 
 1976 – Outstanding Single Performance by a Supporting Actor in Comedy or Drama Special, for: A Moon for the Misbegotten
 1977 – Outstanding Lead Actor in a Drama or Comedy Special, for: Harry S. Truman: Plain Speaking
 1983 – Outstanding Lead Actor in a Drama Series, for: St. Elsewhere

Theatrical awards 
Flanders won the 1974 Tony Award for Best Supporting or Featured Actor in a Dramatic Presentation for his performance in A Moon for the Misbegotten by Eugene O'Neill, for which he also received the 1974 Drama Desk Award for Outstanding Performance.

References 
Notes

External links 
 
  (from where list of film and TV appearances are accessible)
 
 

1934 births
1995 deaths
American male film actors
American male stage actors
Outstanding Performance by a Supporting Actor in a Miniseries or Movie Primetime Emmy Award winners
Outstanding Performance by a Lead Actor in a Drama Series Primetime Emmy Award winners
Outstanding Performance by a Lead Actor in a Miniseries or Movie Primetime Emmy Award winners
Tony Award winners
Suicides by firearm in California
20th-century American male actors
1995 suicides
 United States Army soldiers